Zaeera detzneri is a species of beetle in the family Cerambycidae. It was described by Kriesche in 1923. It is known from Papua New Guinea.

References

Pteropliini
Beetles described in 1923